Against Heresies (Ancient Greek: Ἔλεγχος καὶ ἀνατροπὴ τῆς ψευδωνύμου γνώσεως, Elenchos kai anatropē tēs pseudōnymou gnōseōs, "On the Detection and Overthrow of the So-Called Gnosis"), sometimes referred to by its Latin title Adversus Haereses, is a work of Christian theology written in Greek about the year 180 by Irenaeus, the bishop of Lugdunum (now Lyon in France).

In it, Irenaeus identifies and describes several schools of Gnosticism, as well as other schools of Christian thought, and contrasts their beliefs with orthodox Christianity.

Until the discovery of the Library of Nag Hammadi in 1945, Against Heresies was the best surviving contemporary description of Gnosticism. Today, the treatise remains historically important as one of the first unambiguous attestations of the canonical gospel texts and some of the Pauline epistles. Irenaeus cites from most of the New Testament canon, as well as the noncanonical works 1 Clement and The Shepherd of Hermas; however, he makes no references to Philemon, 2 Peter, 3 John or Jude – four of the shortest epistles.

Only fragments of the original text in ancient Greek remain today, but many complete copies in Latin, the dates of writing of which remain unknown (third or fifth century), still survive. Books IV and V exist in their entirety in a literal version in Armenian.

Purpose
Against Heresies can be dated to sometime between 174 and 189 AD, as the list of the Bishops of Rome includes Eleutherius, but not his successor Victor. The earliest manuscript fragment of Against Heresies, P. Oxy. 405, dates to around 200 AD.

Irenaeus' primary goal in writing Against Heresies was to attack cults that fell away from orthodox Christianity, mainly the Gnostics and Marcionites. In particular, he sought to disprove what he saw as incorrect interpretations of scripture on the part of Gnostics such as Valentinus. Irenaeus sought to present "what was understood as an authentic form of century-old Christian tradition against various forms of Gnosticism." As James VanderKam notes, elements of this early Christian tradition drawn upon by Irenaeus includes apocalyptic traditions such as 1 Enoch.

As bishop, Irenaeus felt compelled to keep a close eye on the Valentinians and to safeguard the church from them. In order to fulfill this duty, Irenaeus became well informed of Gnostic doctrines and traditions. His studies of Gnosticism eventually led to the compilation of this treatise.

Main ideas
Irenaeus argued that orthodox Christianity was passed down to him from the apostles who knew Jesus personally, while the Gnostics and Marcionites were distorting this apostolic tradition.

While the Gnostics offered salvation through secret knowledge available only to a few, Irenaeus contended that the true doctrines of the Christian faith are the same taught by bishops in different areas.

While many of the Gnostics viewed the material world as flawed and from which believers sought to escape to an eternal realm of spirit, Irenaeus saw creation as good and ultimately destined for glorification. As Mark Jeffrey Olson points out,  is quoted more than any other verse from the letters of Paul in Against Heresies:
Both Irenaeus and the Valentinians use this verse to argue for their own understandings of the resurrection of the dead. The Valentinians believed that resurrection was a purely spiritual phenomenon, while Irenaeus insisted that Christians would be raised from the dead in fleshly bodies. According to Irenaeus, this verse was used by the Gnostics to argue that "the handiwork of God is not saved."

Irenaeus also polemicized against Marcion of Sinope, who preached that the creator God of the Hebrew Bible and the Father of Jesus Christ were two different gods. Irenaeus argues that the same god who sent Jesus to the Earth also led man through history by way of the Jewish law and prophets.

Contents
 Book 1: I. Valentinus, II. the Propator, III. the misuse of the Bible, IV. the mother Achamoth, V. the Demiurge, VI. The threefold man, VII. against the incarnation, VIII. the Valentinians misuse of the Bible, IX. refutation by Irenaeus, X. the unity of the church, XI. Valentinus' disciples and others. XII. Ptolemy and Colorbasus. XIII. Marcus. XIV. letters and syllables. XV. Sige on the twenty-four elements. XVI. the Marcosians. XVII. Marcosians. XVIII. Misuse of passages from Genesis. XIX. misuse of Bible XX. apocryphal scriptures, XXI. the heretics on redemption, XXII. deviations from the truth. XXIII. Simon Magus and Menander. XXIV. Saturninus and Basilides. XXV. Carpocrates. XXVI. Cerinthus, the Ebionites, and Nicolaitans. XXVII. Cerdo and Marcion. XXVIII. Tatian, the Encratites. XXIX. Borborians. XXX. Ophites and Sethians. XXXI. Cainites and conclusion of Book I.
 Book 2: A rebuttal of the Gnostic systems employing philosophical arguments primarily rather than employing Scripture. 
Book 3: Rebuttal based on apostolic succession and tradition passed down of the faith; defense of the incarnation of Jesus; defense of the virgin birth.
Book 4: Demonstration that the God of the Old Testament is the God of the New Testament.
Book 5: A defense of the physical resurrection and eternal judgement.

See also
 Celsus
 Didache
 Martyrdom of Polycarp
 POxy 405
 Tertullian

References

External links

Against Heresies – full text at New Advent
Against Heresies – full text at Christian Classics Ethereal Library
Adversus Haereses – full text in Latin (and Greek where it exists)
 

2nd-century Christian texts
Christian anti-Gnosticism
Early Christianity and Gnosticism
Works by the Church Fathers